Lex Luthor: Man of Steel (later collected as simply Luthor) is a five-issue monthly American comic book limited series written by Brian Azzarello and illustrated by Lee Bermejo, which features Superman's nemesis Lex Luthor as the protagonist.

The story explores Luthor's motivations behind being a constant foe to the Man of Steel inside a city that has largely embraced him. Luthor views Superman as a demigod who looks down on humanity and believes that in order to "save" the human race from extraterrestrial threats, Superman must be stopped.

Plot
At the onset of the series, the story seems to be narrated from Luthor's point of view, one depicting himself as someone much different than the ruthless, corrupt killer that readers are accustomed to. He displays a charitable nature by giving a loyal employee an invitation to the grand opening of Luthor's own "Science Spire", a new Metropolis attraction under construction. By contrast, many of the "heroes" Luthor encounters during his story (Superman, Batman) are depicted as duplicitous and unworthy of trust. Luthor watches footage of Superman engaging criminals with heat vision and wonders to himself why the public invests so much trust in an alien simply because he looks human. Meanwhile, in Chechnya, Mr. Elias Orr, one of Lex's operatives, leads a group of mercenaries in a raid to free a Russian scientist named Sasha who is to assist Lex Luthor in a new project.

While holding a meeting, it is brought to Luthor's attention that the union workers building the Science Spire want a higher wage. Luthor tosses his business plan and decides to build and unveil the attraction as a non-profit project, which undercuts the union's demands. Upon leaving the boardroom full of stunned executives, Luthor arrives at his lab where he observes Hope, a woman floating inside a gigantic vat apparently asleep. Luthor ask Sasha if he can speak with Hope and Sasha opens the communication relay systems barrier which causes Hope's eyes to open. Luthor then engages in a conversation with Hope to see how in turn she responds in kind. Hope asks some questions about how Luthor thinks and feels about her. Luthor tells Hope how important she is to him and that how he promised that Sasha would make her better. After this conversation has taken place Sasha informs Luthor that although it is good that Hope responds with questions, what is truly missing are synapses and what is inside. Luthor wishes for a past for Hope but that there is nothing for her outside her development chamber and that what he wants requires more. Luthor then tells Sasha he will get it for him.  Sometime later, Orr beats and threatens the union leader into complying with his demands while Lex flies to Gotham City to try to arrange a deal with Bruce Wayne (Batman). Luthor lets Bruce know that he heard of the breakthrough made at Thomas Labs, one of Bruce's research facilities at Wayne Enterprises, on the Alzheimer's front and that he thinks that it could be beneficial on another. Lex also tells Bruce of the potential threat that Superman poses due to his vast array of powers and overall strength. As a gift, Lex presents Bruce with kryptonite and asks him to consider how the public only has Superman's word that he will not turn on them.

That night, Batman is looking at the kryptonite when Superman arrives in Gotham and uses his breath to blow the kryptonite from Batman's hand before confronting Batman in a brief but intense fight. Superman eventually bests Batman. Superman goes to finish the confrontation with a knockout punch to Batman's face before stopping, x-ray visioning Batman's utility belt, picking out Batman's own lead-lined piece of Kryptonite and crushing in his fist. Later that evening Bruce calls Lex and tells him he will give the research to Luthor.

At the opening for the Science Spire, Lex announces the arrival of a new superhero by introducing Hope to the public, the result of the Sasha's work and Wayne's medicinal breakthroughs. Hope displays abilities of super-strength and flight, essentially replacing Superman and becoming a corporate-sponsored hero who soon takes on duties normally reserved for Superman. One month later and Hope has gained a loyal following. At Lexcorp, Lex tells Hope how proud he is of her and that she is more than that he had ever dreamed she would be, much to the chagrin of his secretary Mona. 

The next day at Lexcorp, Hope's Q-rating has gone up through the roof. Luthor watches Hope on TV as she is being given an interview. She tells the reporter named Reggie that her favorite place to eat is at an eatery called The Pineapple King as her father took her there once when she was five and she was hooked for life. It is now realized that Luthor has used Bruce's research on his Alzheimer's aiding technology so as to give Hope these fake memories as her past like Sasha asked for earlier. Reggie then makes a joke about hoping that she will not be taking the Justice League there when they come recruiting her or there will be lines wrapped right down around the block. Hope informs Reggie that she has no intention of joining The Justice League as she is a born-and-raised Metropolitan girl. She states that there are many heroes in the country and that they are all blessed to have Justice League as those heroes but her heart belongs to the city of Metropolis as it is her home and it is their home.

Orr approaches Winslow Schott (Toyman) with an offer on behalf of Lex. Hope and Lex are in bed together when a news bulletin breaks that Schott is wanted for a bombing at the Metropolis Daycare Center (in which over seventy adults and children, including, coincidentally, Sasha and his family are killed). Orr realizes that he has been double-crossed when Schott mentions a different kind of explosive being delivered to him from someone other than Orr's men. Lex urges Hope to bring the criminal to justice.

Inside his warehouse, Toyman is confronted by Superman, who is immediately met by Toyman's soldiers as Hope grabs Schott and soars into the sky with him. From a separate location, Lex activates a control and causes her to drop Toyman, a development that pleases many of those watching on television. At the last moment, Superman flies up and catches Toyman.

Hope wonders why she involuntarily let Toyman go just as Superman confronts her for attempted murder. Hope attacks Superman and flies away towards the Science Spire. During a battle with Superman, Hope is blasted by his eye lasers, revealing to both of them that Hope is actually an android. Lex then remotely detonates Hope, causing the Science Spire to explode. This destroys all evidence that she was an android and makes it appear as though Superman killed her.

Superman flies to Lex's office, where he is waiting with his back turned. Lex says that not one person in Metropolis wanted to see Schott live after the destruction he caused and that, even with his many visions, Superman can't see Luthor's soul. Lex is infuriated by Superman’s silent judgment and demands he say something. Superman simply says, "You're wrong...I can see your soul". Taken aback, Lex pounds the window in defiance then tries to regain composure, saying that, if Superman could, he would see a man who sacrificed everything, including hope, for "A world without a Superman" and that if just one person out there saw Superman saving a condemned man and "realizes what you are" then his actions were worthwhile. Luthor turns away from the window, asking him to "Please, just fly away". Superman complies, soaring off with a sad expression, leaving Lex with the thought "I am a man. I hope".

Reception
Man of Steel received mostly positive reviews upon release and garnered attention to the team of Azzarello and Bermejo, who had previously worked together on Batman/Deathblow: After the Fire. The team would reunite in 2008 for the hardcover graphic novel simply entitled Joker, sparking fan speculation about a possible "villain spotlight" trend due to their works with Superman and Batman's greatest foes.

Collected editions

Paperback

Hardcover

References

External links
DC page

Comics by Brian Azzarello